The Open Clinical Biochemistry Journal (formerly The Open Clinical Chemistry Journal) is a peer-reviewed open-access medical journal, which publishes research articles, reviews, and letters in all areas of clinical chemistry and laboratory medicine.

Abstracting and indexing 
The journal is indexed in: 
 Chemical Abstracts
 Scopus
 EMBASE

References

External links 
 

Open access journals
Publications established in 2008
Bentham Open academic journals
English-language journals
Laboratory medicine journals
Medicinal chemistry journals